Umberto Ridi (17 August 1913 - 1981) was an Italian hurdler who competed at the 1936 Summer Olympics.

References

External links 
 

1913 births
1981 deaths
Athletes (track and field) at the 1936 Summer Olympics
Italian male hurdlers
Olympic athletes of Italy